Below is a list of primary and secondary schools in the Middle Eastern country of Lebanon. Tertiary schools are included in the list of universities in Lebanon.

Beirut Governorate
Schools in the Beirut Governorate include:

École Saint Vincent de Paul - Filles de la Charité - Clemenceau ; 
Collège des Soeurs des Saints-Coeurs - Sioufi - Rue Sioufi, Ashrafieh 
Collège Protestant Français - Rue Madame Curie 
 College de la Sagesse St Elie-Clemenceau - Rue Clémenceau
 College La Sagesse St Maron – Jdeideh – Metn ; 
 A & C Haydakos High School College – 
 Ahliah school
 Al-Makassed Philanthropic Islamic Association of Beirut – 
 Al Bayader Beirut School
 American Academy of Beirut
 Armenian Evangelical Central High School – Achrafieh neighborhood of Beirut (city); 
 Armenian Evangelical Guertmenian School – Achrafieh neighborhood of Beirut (city)
 American Community School at Beirut
 Beirut Baptist School
 Beirut Evangelical School for Girls and Boys
 Beirut Modern School – 
 College La Sagesse St Joseph – Ashrafieh – Achrafieh neighborhood of Beirut (city); 
 Collège Louise Wegmann – 
 College Melkart – 
 Collège Notre Dame de Nazareth – Achrafieh neighborhood of Beirut (city); 
 Collège Saint-Elie Btina – Beirut
 Collège Saint François Des Peres Capucinns – Hamra neighborhood of Beirut (city)
 Ecole des Trois Docteurs – Achrafieh neighborhood of Beirut (city); established 1835; 
 Ecole Secondaire des Filles de la Charité – Achrafieh neighborhood of Beirut (city); 
 Ecole Zahret El Ihsan (ZEI) – Achrafieh neighborhood of Beirut (city); established 1880; 
 Grand Lycée Franco-Libanais – Achrafieh neighborhood of Beirut (city)
 Collège Protestant Français- Kraytem - Beirut (city); 
 Hariri High School II – 
 International College, Beirut – Beirut; established 1891
 Lebanese International School – Beirut
 Lycée Abdel Kader – Batrakieh neighborhood of Beirut (city)
 Lycée Français International Elite – Msaytbeh neighborhood of Beirut (city)
 Lycée Franco-Libanais Verdun – Beirut
 Le lycée national beirut 
 Makassed Abed Al-Hadi Debs Vocational and Technical Center – 
 Makassed Abi Bakr Al-Sedeeq Elementary School – 
 Makassed Aisha Omm Al-Moemeneen Elementary School
 Makassed Ali Bin Abi Taleb College – 
 Makassed Khadija Al-Kobra College – 
 Makassed Khaled Bin Al-Walid College – 
 Makassed Khalil Shehab Elementary School – 
 Makassed Omar Bin Al-Khattab College – 
 Makassed Othman Zi Al-Nourayn Elementary School
 Museum College - Beirut
 Wellspring Learning Community
 Yeprem and Martha Philibosian Armenian Evangelical College
 Students' Paradise School Beirut since 1962 www.paradise-school.com
Saint Mary's Orthodox College (SMOC)

Bekaa Governorate
Schools in the Bekaa Governorate include:

 School of Talents [Berr Al-Yas]
 Armenian Evangelical Secondary School of Anjar – Anjar
 Armenian Haratch CG School – Anjar
 Collège du Christ-Roi – Zahlé
 College Notre Dame des Apotres – Qabb Ilyas; 
 Collège St. Joseph des Soeurs Antonines – Ksara, Zahlé; 
 Lebanese International College – Rashaya
 Baaloul Public School
 Makassed Al-Loweis School
 Makassed Berr Al-Yas School
 Makassed Ersal School
 Makassed Ghazza School
 Makassed Jdaydet Al-Fakeha School
 Makassed Kaderiyya School
 Makassed Kamed Al-Lawz School
 Makassed Karoun School
 Makassed Kebb Al-Yas School
 Makassed Lala School
 Makassed Majdal Anjar School
 Makassed Marj School
 Makassed Swayri School
 Omar Al Mukhtar Al Tarbawy (OMEC)
 Al Manara Official High School 
 Secondary Evangelical School Zahle
 Phoenix International School – Haret Hreik; 

Canadian Academy of Baalbeck 
International and Lebanese curriculum- Douris Baalbeck

Secondary Evangelical School-Zahle

Mount Lebanon Governorate
Schools in the Mount Lebanon Governorate include:

 The International School of Choueifat – Choueifat Choueifat
 
 SABIS® International School – Adma Adma wa Dafneh
 
 Leila C. Saad SABIS® School El-Metn Mtein
 
 Toulouse College - Hadat
 Lebanon Evangelical School for Boys and Girls - Loueizeh 
 Lebanese American School – Aramoun; 
 Beirut International School
 Albayan School – Choueifat, Beirut; 
 LWIS Adma International School 
 Albayan High School – Hadat, Beirut; 
 Amjad High School – Choueifat
 Armenian Evangelical Peter and Elizabeth Torosian School – Amanos
 Armenian Evangelical Shamlian Tatigian Secondary School – Bourj Hammoud
 Athenee de Beyrouth – Bsalim
 Baskinta official public school - Baskinta
 Bchamoun Official Secondary School – Bchamoun
 BoldWin International School – Baakleen; 
 Brummana High School – 
 College Des Apôtres – Jounieh
 Central College of the Lebanese Monks – Jounieh
 Christian Teaching Institute – Sin el Fil; 
 Collège de Besançon – Baabdat
 Collège Elysée – Hazmieh; 
Member of aefe
 Collège des Frères Maristes Champville – Dik El Mehdi
 Collège des Sœurs des Saints Cœurs Kfarhbab – Ghazir
 
 Collège des Sœurs des Saints Cœurs Hadath – Hadath, Mount Lebanon
 College Notre Dame de Louaize – Zouk Mosbeh; 
 College Notre Dame des Graces – Kfarshima
 Collège Saint Joseph – Antoura – Antoura; 
Dhour Shweir Public Secondary School_Shweir
 Eastwood College – Kfarshima; established 1973 
 Eastwood International School – Mansourieh; established 1973 
 Eidyia Private School (After School) – Rabieh; 
 Hassan Kassir High School - Bir Hassan
 Hripsimiantz College – Jdeideh; 
 Institution Moderne du Liban – Fanar; 
 Jesus and Mary School – Rabieh, Cornet Chahwan; 
 Lebanese Modern School – Baakleen
 Lycee Amchit – Amsheet; 
 Lycée de Ville – Adonis, Zouk Mosbeh; etablissement homologué par le Ministère français de l'Education Nationale; 
 Le lycée national Choueifat; 
 Lycée Franco-Libanais Nahr Ibrahim – Nahr Ibrahim
 Makassed Barja School
 Makassed Khaldeh School
 Montana International College - Deek El Mehdi 
 New Century School – Choueifat; 
 Sagesse High School – Ain Saadeh; 
College des freres Mont La Salle - Ain Saade
 Saint Joseph School – Cornet Chahwan; 
 Shouf High School – Bakaata
 Universal College – Aley; 
 Wafaa Secondary School – Baakleen
 Yeghishe Manoukian College – Dbayeh

North Governorate
Schools in the North Governorate include:

 The International School of Choueifat - Koura ;
 
 Rawdat Al-Fayhaa secondary school ( tripoli,Lebanon) https://rawdafayha.edu.lb/
 Collège des Soeurs des Saints Coeurs - El Mina; 
 Azm School – Tripoli; 
 David Karam Educational Campus -   Koura District
 Ecole des Peres Antonins - El Mina
 Lycée Franco-Libanais Tripoli – Tripoli
 Makassed Akkar Al-Atika School – Akkar al-Atika
 Makassed Anfeh School
 Makassed Bayt Ayoub School 
 Makassed Bebneen School
 Makassed Der Amar School
 Makassed Fnaydek School
 Makassed Mhammara School
 Makassed Moshmosh School
 Makassed Wadi Al-Jamous School
 Makassed Wata Moshmosh School
 Modern School – Akkar District
 Sainte Famille Maronite – Tripoli
 Tripoli Evangelical School for Boys & Girls – Tripoli

 noor el Houda school

South Governorate
Schools in the South Governorate include:

 Al Hadara College - Lebaa, Jezzine District
Al Ittihad School - Tyre, Hay Al Ramel, School Number: 07740212
 Al-Qualaa Secondary School - Sidon; 
 College Notre Dame de Machmouché – Jezzine
 Makassed Dayaat Al-Arab School
 Makassed Sedekeen School
 Makassed Selaa School
 Makassed Shaayteyye School
 National Evangelical Institute for Girls & Boys – Sidon; 
 Rafic Hariri High School – Sidon; 
 Tyre Community School – Jal El Bahr, Tyre; established 2012; 
 Tyre Official School for Girls

Sscc jezzine

Unsorted

A–D

 Adma International School - Adma, Fatka
 Adventist Secondary School – 
 A.G.B.U. Boghos K. Garmirian 
 A.G.B.U. Levon G. Nazarian
 A.G.B.U. Tarouhy Hovagimian Secondary School
 Al Amlieh High School
 Al Batoul
 Al Bayader
 Al Iman
 Al Mahdi
 Al Mustafa School
 Al Rafiid
 Al Takmalia - Halba
 Al Zahraa School - Borj al Shimali
 American High School Saida
 Amilieh Technical Institute – higher educational institute
 Antonine International School
 Antonine Sisters School Ksara, Ghazir, Mar Elias
 Ashrafieh Public Secondary School
 Barja Modern School
 Bourj International College
 Canadian High School (Aramoun/Bshamoun) 
 Cedars International School – 
 Charite
 Charity School Mreijeh (Antoine N. Houaiss)
 City International School (CIS)
 Collège de la Providence – established 1952; 
 College de la Sagesse St Elie-Clemenceau
 College des Apotres – Rawda
 Collège des Frères Maristes – Byblos
 Collège des Pères Antonin Baabda
 College des Soeur du Rosaire Mountazah
 Collège des Soeurs des Saints Coeurs – Bickfaya, Kfarhbab, Ain Najem Mansourieh, Fakiha, Byblos, Sioufi
 College Louise Wegman
 Collège Mar Doumit des Soeurs Antonines – 
 Collège Melkart – 
 Collège Notre Dame – Balamand
 Collège Notre Dame de Jamhour
 College Notre Dame des Soeurs Salvatoriennes – Aabra
 Collège Notre Dame des Soeurs Salvatoriennes Hadath-Baabda
 Collège Patriarcal
 Collège Protestant Francais – 
 Collège Sacre-Coeur Gemmayze – established 1894
 Collège Saint-Grégoire – affiliated to the Collège Notre Dame de Jamhour
 Computer and Industrial Sciences College (also known as CIS College) – 
 Deutsche Schule Beirut (German School Beirut)

E–Z

 Ecole Val Pere Jacques – Bkenneya
 Ecoles D'Irfane
 George Mhanna's School
 Greater Beirut Evangelical School
 GreenField College – Bir Hassan
 Guardian Angel School – Byblos
 Ikhaa National School
 International College, Ain Aar – Ain Aar; established 1891
 International Lessing School Chouifat Amjad School
 International School – Al Koura; established 1985
 Institut Pédagogique National de L'Enseignement Technique – higher educational institute
 La Cité Nationale
 Lady of Balamand High School
 Lebanese English International School
 Lebanon Evangelical School for Boys and Girls, Loueizeh
 Levon & Sophia Hagopian Armenian College
 Ligue Des Freres
 Lycée Adonis
 Lycée de la Finnesse
 Lycée Déscartes – Baasir
 Lycée Hamidiye Arka Akkar
 Lycée Laique
 Lycée Laure Moughayzel - Chahrouri
 Lycée Musé
 Lycée National
 Lycée Notre Dame
 Lycée Pascal
 Mar Sawarios
 Maten High School
 Melankton and Haig Arslanian Djemaran
 Mesrobian College
 Modern Community School – Ain Al Rummaneh
 Mont La Salle Ain-Saade
 Montana International College – Deek El Mehdi
 Moussaitbeh Secondary Adventist School – ; established 1929
 National American School
 Notre Dames des Graces
 Perpetual School
 Rawdat Al Fayhaa Schools
 Toulouse College
 Rawda High School
 Rayan Abou Hamdan High School – El Malek
 Sagesse Saint Jean Brasilia
 Saint Joseph de l'Apparition
 Saint Mary's Orthodox School
 Ste Anne Besançon Beyrouth
 Sainte Famille
 Universal High School – Doha Aramoun
 Zahrat al-Ihsan (Flower of Charity) – established 1880

See also

 Education in Lebanon
 Lists of schools

References

Schools

Schools
Schools
Lebanon
Lebanon